Ramazan Keskin (born 4 January 1999) is a Turkish professional footballer who plays as a midfielder for TFF Second League club Kastamonuspor 1966.

Professional career
Keskin made his professional debut with Bursaspor in a 1-0 Süper Lig win over MKE Ankaragücü on 6 October 2018, and assisted the game-winning goal.

References

External links
 
 
 

1999 births
People from Alaçam
Living people
Turkish footballers
Turkey youth international footballers
Association football midfielders
Bursaspor footballers
Süper Lig players
TFF First League players
TFF Second League players